A houseplant, sometimes known as a pot plant, potted plant, or an indoor plant, is an ornamental plant that is grown indoors. As such, they are found in places like residences and offices, mainly for decorative purposes. Common houseplants are usually tropical or semi-tropical, and are often epiphytes, succulents or cacti.

Cultural history

Early history
The history of houseplants is intertwined with the history of container gardening in general.  Ancient Egyptians and Sumerians grew ornamental and fruiting plants in decorative containers. Ancient Greeks and the Romans cultivated laurel trees (Laurus nobilis) in earthenware vessels. In ancient China, potted plants were shown at garden exhibitions over 2,500 years ago.

In the medieval era, gillyflowers (Dianthus caryophyllus) were displayed in containers.

Early modern era

In the Renaissance, plant collectors and affluent merchants from Italy, the Netherlands and Belgium imported plants from Asia Minor and the East Indies. Creeping groundsel was introduced in Malta and the rest of Europe in the 15th century as an ornamental plant. 

In the 17th century, fascination in exotic plants grew among the aristocracy of France and England, with inventor and writer Sir Hugh Platt publishing Garden of Eden in 1660, which was a book about how to grow plants indoors. Wealthy British households purchased imported fruit trees, especially citrus trees, to grow in specialized orangeries. Less wealthy people would also grow plants, especially flowers, indoors. Orange trees became less fashionable as international commerce in oranges became more widespread. Succulents, such as aloes, were also cultivated.

18th century
In the early 18th century, windows in London became wider and brighter, expanding the opportunities for the lower classes to grow plants indoors.

The expansion of European colonialism brought Europeans into contact with a wide variety of new plants, especially tropical plants more suited to growing as houseplants. Explorers and botanists brought over 5,000 species to Europe from South America, Africa, Asia and Australia.

Forcing plants to bloom out of season, especially bulbs, was very popular in this era. The decorative pot or cachepot specifically for growing houseplants (as opposed to a simple terracotta pot, or a decorative vase) was developed in this era as ceramic manufacturing took off.

Plant breeding developed in the late 17th and 18th centuries. These innovations were drawn and presented in the botanical gardens and in private court collections. At the end of the 18th century, flower tables became part of the salons. Furthermore, nurseries were flourishing in the 18th century, which stocked thousands of plants, including citrus, jasmines, mignonette, bays, myrtles, agaves and aloes.

19th century

The Victorian era saw the first use of houseplants by the middle class, which were perceived as a symbol of social status and moral value. Some foliage plants which tolerated the typical gloomy and snug environment inside a Victorian house became popular. The quintessential Victorian plants were palms (such as kentia palms and parlour palms), the cast iron plant, and ferns. Ferns were grown in Wardian cases, an early type of terrarium. Geraniums were often placed on window ledges and in drawing rooms and were the most affordable houseplant for the average Briton.

In 1818, orchids were introduced to Europe when they were used as packing material for the shipment of other rare plants. German ivy was introduced in the United States sometime in the 19th century as a houseplant.

Other typical Victorian houseplants included mop-head chrysanthemums and yuccas.

At the end of the 19th century, the range already included begonias, cineraria, clivia, cyclamen and flamingo flowers, but also leafy ornamental plants such as silver fir, ornamental asparagus, lilium, snake plant, and rubber tree.

20th century
In the early 20th century, there was a turn against houseplants as they were seen as dated relics of the cluttered Victorian era. When there were houseplants, the more architecturally shaped cacti and succulents were the most common.  In the 1920s, commercial houseplant production began in California, focused on the Kentia palm and the pothos, later expanding to include Philodendron and Araucaria species in the 1940s. 

During World War II, houseplants became more common in offices, which began to more closely resemble the domestic environment as more women entered the workforce. 

By 1960, Florida produced more than 55% of American houseplants, and has remained the main producer of houseplants for the American market since. Philodendrons, rubber plants and geraniums were mainstays of the postwar era. Many plants entered the United States and the United Kingdom through the influence of Scandinavian design, which featured plants. Tropical plants like bromeliads, birds of paradise, and philodendrons were popular accents in tiki-themed spaces. The postwar years also saw a broader commercialization of houseplants. In the 1960s, plant care labels were introduced, and garden centers became ubiquitous in the 1970s.

A lush display of houseplants fit into the environmentalist and hippie movements in the 1970s; a large indoor garden is characteristic of 1970s design. Leafy plants were popular, particularly ferns and spider plants, often in macramé hanging planters. Monstera deliciosa, ferns, aloes and snake plants (Dracaena sp., usually sold under their former genus of Sanseveria) were also popular.  Terrariums and bottle gardens began to appear as well. 

In the 1980s, houseplants were often limited to large, lush statement pieces, particularly in bathrooms. The rise of shopping malls with large skylights created a new place for plants to be grown. In the 1990s, moth orchids became trendy. The 1990s also brought a wave of interest in artificial plants.

21st century

Beginning in the mid to late 2010s, fashionable plants from earlier decades were revitalized and popularized by social media, especially Instagram, with "plantstagram" becoming a major driver of trendy plants. In 2015, 5 million Americans took up plant-related hobbies. In 2017, 30% of American households purchased at least one houseplant.   

Interest in houseplants exploded during the Covid-19 pandemic in 2020. With people forced to spend more time indoors, many sought to fill their homes with houseplants. Plants were mentioned on Instagram an average of more than 3,000 times a day in July 2021 and the hashtag #plantmom has been used more than 2.6 million times. Plant sales in 2020 were at an all-time high, which brought concerns about the environmental impact of the industry.

Some of the most popular plants in the 2020s are the Monstera deliciosa and other aroids, as well as the fiddle-leaf fig. This era saw a larger interest in growing plants with interesting or attractive forms or foliage, rather than focusing solely on flowers.

Care

Houseplants have care requirements that differ from plants grown outdoors. Moisture, light, soil mixture, temperature, humidity, fertilizers, and potting are all important factors. Each plant species has different care requirements, and care requirements can vary based on the specific pot, location in a particular home and potting mix used. 

Most houseplants are species that have adapted to survive in a temperature range between 15 °C to 25 °C (60 °F to 80 °F) year-round, because those adapted for temperate environments require winter temperatures outside of normal indoor conditions. Within that limitation, there are houseplants which are native to many different types of habitats, from tropical rainforests to succulents and cacti native to deserts. Many houseplants are either epiphytes or live in seasonally dry ecosystems that help them adapt to the dry indoor air and inconsistent watering many houseplants are subject to. Often, houseplants from tropical areas are understory plants, and because they grown in shady conditions naturally, they are often able to thrive in lower-light conditions.

Houseplants are typically grown in specialized soilless mixtures called potting compost (in the UK), potting mix, or potting soil. Most potting mixes contain a combination of peat or coir and vermiculite or perlite. 

Keeping plants consistently too wet ("overwatering") leads to the roots sitting in water, which often leads to root rot. Root rot is the most common cause of death for houseplants but keeping houseplants too dry ("under-watering") can also be detrimental. 

Plants require nitrate, phosphate, and potassium to survive, as well as micronutrients including boron, zinc, manganese, iron, copper, molybdenum, and chlorine. Houseplants do not have access to these nutrients unless they are fertilized regularly. 

House plants are generally planted in pots that have drainage holes, to reduce the likelihood of over-watering and standing water. Pots are typically broken down into two groups: porous and non-porous. Porous pots (usually terracotta) provide better aeration as air passes laterally through the sides of the pot. Non-porous pots such as glazed or plastic pots tend to hold moisture longer and restrict airflow.

Houseplants experience a range of pests. Fungus gnats, spider mites, mealybugs, thrips and scale are common pests.

Alternative growing methods
Houseplants are also grown in a variety of media other than potting mix, often in a hydroponic or semi-hydroponic system. This may overlap with aquascaping. Materials like sand, gravel, brick, expanded clay aggregate and styrofoam may be employed.

Some epiphytic plants may be grown mounted, either with their roots in potting mix and their stems attached to supports, or with their roots wrapped in sphagnum moss and attached to a vertical surface with wire. This can also overlap with the practice of kokedama.

Production 
Houseplants are obtained either by collecting wild specimens of plants, or by growing them in greenhouses or commercial nurseries.

Wild collection of plants for the houseplant trade is a major threat to many species, especially plants with limited native ranges. Plants which are particularly threatened in this way are cacti, succulents, and carnivorous plants, especially Venus flytraps.

Plants grown for commercial production may be produced from seed, by using traditional propagation techniques, or through tissue culture. In 2002, the wholesale value of foliage plants grown in the United States was roughly 700 million dollars, mostly grown in Florida. In 2018, houseplant growers in the Netherlands produced a billion houseplants for the European market.

Effects of houseplants
Houseplants do not have an appreciable effect on the concentration of volatile organic compounds (VOCs) in normal home environments: it would require between 10 and 1000 houseplants per square meter to achieve the same level of VOC removal as occurs from passive exchange between indoor and outdoor air. 
The idea that houseplants have an appreciable effect on indoor air quality is largely based on the Clean Air Study conducted by NASA in the 1980s. The study tested plants in sealed chambers and with highly elevated levels of volatile organic compounds (specifically benzene, trichloroethylene and formaldehyde). It concluded that to the extent that houseplants improve air quality, the mechanism of action is microorganisms within the potting soil, rather than the plants themselves.

Houseplants do have a statistically significant effect on the concentrations of both carbon monoxide and carbon dioxide in normal indoor environments, reducing carbon dioxide levels by 10-25% and carbon monoxide levels by up to 90%.  The effect has been investigated by NASA for use in spacecraft. 

Plants also appear to increase the number and diversity of bacteria in homes, while reducing fungal diversity. They tend to increase humidity, reduce temperature swings, and reduce noise.

There are also many claimed psychological and physiological benefits to having houseplants. A critical review of the experimental literature concluded "The reviewed studies suggest that indoor plants can provide psychological benefits such as stress-reduction and increased pain tolerance. However, they also showed substantial heterogeneity in methods and results. We therefore have strong reservations about general claims that indoor plants cause beneficial psychological changes. It appears that benefits are contingent on features of the context in which the indoor plants are encountered and on characteristics of the people encountering them."

List of common houseplants

Tropical and subtropical
Aglaonema (Chinese evergreen)
Alocasia and Colocasia spp. (elephant ear)
Anthurium spp.
Aphelandra squarrosa (zebra plant)
Araucaria heterophylla (Norfolk Island pine)
Aspidistra elatior (cast iron plant)
Begonia species and cultivars
Bromeliaceae (bromeliads, including air plants)
Calathea, Goeppertia and Maranta spp. (prayer plants)
Chlorophytum comosum (spider plant)
Citrus (compact cultivars such as the Meyer lemon)
Cyclamen 
Dieffenbachia (dumbcane)
Epipremnum aureum (pothos)
Ferns and plants treated like ferns, such as Asparagus aethiopicus (asparagus fern) and Nephrolepis exaltata (Boston fern) 
Ficus spp., including Ficus benjamina (weeping fig), Ficus elastica (rubber plant) and Ficus lyrata (fiddle-leaf fig)
Hoya spp.
Orchidaceae (orchid) spp.
Peperomia spp.
Palms, such as Chamaedorea elegans (parlor palm) and Dypsis lutescens (areca palm), 
Philodendron spp.
Monstera species (Swiss cheese plants)
Schefflera arboricola (umbrella plant)
Sinningia speciosa (gloxinia)
Spathiphyllum (peace lily)
Stephanotis floribunda (Madagascar jasmine)
Streptocarpus, including Streptocarpus sect. Saintpaulia (African violets)
Tradescantia zebrina (purple wandering Jew)
Pilea peperomioides
Scindapsus pictus (satin pothos)

Succulents

Aloe spp. including Aloe vera
Cactaceae (cacti)
Epiphyllum (orchid cacti)
Mammillaria
Opuntia (paddle cacti, including the prickly pear)
Zygocactus (Christmas cactus)
Gymnocalycium mihanovichii (chin cactus)
Crassula ovata (jade plant)
Echeveria spp.
Haworthia spp.
Dracaena spp., including plants formerly in the genus Sansevieria, such as the snake plant or mother-in-law's tongue, Dracaena trifasciata.
Senecio angulatus (creeping groundsel)
Senecio rowleyanus (string of pearls)
Yucca spp.

Forced bulbs
Note: Many forced bulbs are also temperate.
Crocus
Hippeastrum (amaryllis)
Hyacinthus (hyacinth)
Narcissus (narcissus or daffodil)

Temperate plants
Hedera helix (English ivy)
Saxifraga stolonifera (strawberry begonia)

See also
Indoor bonsai

References

External links

 
Interior design